Al-Shymaa Kway-Geer (born 1960) is a member of the parliamentary body, the National Assembly, of Tanzania. She is one of 48 women appointed to the Assembly by President Jakaya Kikwete. She was appointed in 2008.

Kway-Geer was born in Tanga, Tanzania.

A former airline clerk, Kway-Geer, who has albinism, is charged with improving the treatment of such people in Tanzania, where many believe the condition to be a curse or source of magical power. Persecution of people with albinism is common in the region, including murder, mutilation and the harvesting of body parts.

See also
 Salum Khalfani Bar'wani, the first person with albinism elected to the National Assembly of Tanzania.

References

Jeffrey Gettelman. "Albinos in Tanzania face deadly threat" in New York Times, June 8, 2008
article on Kwegyir
Washington Times article on Kwegyir

People with albinism
Albinism in Tanzania
Living people
1960 births
Members of the National Assembly (Tanzania)
21st-century Tanzanian women politicians